These are the results of the women's doubles competition in badminton at the 2004 Summer Olympics in Athens.

Medalists

Seeds 
  (gold medalist)
  (silver medalist)
  (bronze medalist)
  (fourth place)
  (quarter-finals)
  (quarter-finals)
  (quarter-finals)
  (second round)

Draw

Finals

Top half

Bottom half

References
tournamentsoftware.com

Badminton at the 2004 Summer Olympics
Olymp
Women's events at the 2004 Summer Olympics